The Eskimo–Uralic hypothesis posits that the Uralic and Eskimo–Aleut language families belong to a common macrofamily. It is not generally accepted by linguists because the similarities can also be merely areal features, common to unrelated language families. In 1818, the Danish linguist Rasmus Rask grouped together the languages of Greenlandic and Finnish. The Eskimo–Uralic hypothesis was put forward by Knut Bergsland in 1959. A similar theory was suggested in 1998 by Michael Fortescue, an expert in Eskimo–Aleut and Chukotko-Kamchatkan, in his book Language Relations across Bering Strait where he proposed the Uralo-Siberian theory, which, unlike the Eskimo-Uralic hypothesis includes the Yukaghir languages.

History 
Comparisons between Uralic and Eskimo–Aleut languages were made early. In 1746, the Danish theologian  compared Greenlandic to Hungarian. In 1818, Rasmus Rask considered Greenlandic to be related to the Uralic languages, Finnish in particular, and presented a list of lexical correspondences (Rask also considered Uralic and Altaic to be related to each other). In 1959, Knut Bergsland published the paper The Eskimo–Uralic Hypothesis, in which he, like other authors before him, presented a number of grammatical similarities and a small number of lexical correspondences.

In 1998, Michael Fortescue presented more detailed arguments in his book, Language Relations across Bering Strait. His title evokes Morris Swadesh's 1962 article, "Linguistic relations across the Bering Strait". Besides new linguistic evidence, Fortescue (2017) presents several genetic studies that support a common origin of the included groups, with a suggested homeland in Northeast Asia.

Evidence

Morphology

Apparently shared elements of Eskimo–Uralic morphology include the following:

Lexicon

Fortescue (1998) lists 94 lexical correspondence sets with reflexes in at least three language families, and even more shared by two of the language families. Examples are *ap(p)a 'grandfather', *kað'a 'mountain' and many others. However he proposed a larger language family than Eskimo-Uralic.

Below are some lexical items reconstructed to Proto-Eskimo–Uralic, along with their reflexes in Proto-Uralic, and Proto-Eskimo–Aleut.

Regular sound correspondences
Proposed sound correspondences:

Examples of proposed regular sound correspondences

Uralic *t- : Eskimo *t- (before a Uralic back vowel)
Proto-Uralic *tolɨ- ‘come’
Proto-Eskimo *tulaɣ- ‘to land'
Proto-Finno-Ugric *toxi- ‘bring’
Proto-Eskimo *təkit- ‘arrive'
Proto-Uralic *tumti- ‘know’
Proto-Eskimo *tucaʀ- ‘understand’
Proto-Finno-Ugric *tålå ‘shelter’
Proto-Eskimo *talu(-) ‘screen or partition’

Uralic *t- : Eskimo *c- (before a Uralic front vowel)
Proto-Finno-Ugric *täwi ‘full’
Proto-Eskimo *ciləɣ- ‘be full’
Proto-Finno-Ugric *teki- ‘do’
Proto-Eskimo *caɣiqə- ‘make an effort’

Uralic *ń- : Eskimo *Ø-
Proto-Uralic *ńåxlɨ- ‘lick’
Proto-Eskimo *aluɣ- ‘lick’

Uralic *Ø- : Eskimo *n-
Proto-Finno-Ugric *äktä ‘cut’
Proto-Eskimo *naɣci(t)- ‘catch on bottom’
Proto-Finno-Ugric *uwå ‘stream’
Proto-Eskimo *nuvaɣ ‘saliva’
Proto-Uralic and Proto-Eskimo-Aleut number and case markers
Proto-Uralic and Proto-Eskimo-Aleut number and case markers:

Possessive suffixes
Possessive suffixes:

Nenets accusative and Eskimo relative possessive affixes

A few potential lexical cognates between Proto-Uralic and Eskimo–Aleut are pointed out in Aikio (2019: 53–54). These are:

A regular sound correspondence with Uralic *-l- and Proto-Eskimo-Aleut *-t can be seen.

The words "morning" and "weave" appear to be completely unrelated, which means there is an instance of coincidental homonymy, which very rarely happens by accident. Aikio thus stated that it's very likely there is some connection between the two families, but exact conclusions can't be drawn.

Relationships

Some or all of the Eskimo–Uralic families have been included in more extensive groupings of languages, most notably the Eurasiatic languages. Fortescue's hypothesis does not oppose or exclude these various proposals. Although Eurasiatic includes both Eskimo–Uralic and Uralic, proponents of Eurasiatic consider that the relationship between them is remote. In particular, Uralic is most closely related to Indo-European, whereas Eskimo–Aleut is most closely related to Chukotko-Kamchatkan and Altaic (or some part of Altaic).

The linguist Frederik Kortlandt (2006:1) asserts that Indo-Uralic (a proposed language family consisting of Uralic and Indo-European) is itself a branch of Eskimo–Uralic and that, furthermore, the Nivkh language also belongs to Eskimo–Uralic. This would make Eskimo–Uralic the proto-language of a much vaster language family. Kortlandt (2006:3) considers that Eskimo–Uralic and Altaic (defined by him as consisting of Turkic, Mongolian, Tungusic, Korean, and Japanese) may be coordinate branches of the Eurasiatic language family proposed by Joseph Greenberg.

Related language family proposals
 Eurasiatic languages
 Indo-Uralic languages
 Nostratic languages
 Ural–Altaic languages
 Uralic–Yukaghir languages
 Chukotko-Kamchatkan–Amuric languages

See also
 Paleosiberian languages
 Proto-Chukotko-Kamchatkan language
 Proto-Uralic language
 Classification of indigenous languages of the Americas
 Linguistic areas of the Americas

References

 
 
 
 Künnap, A. 1999. Indo-European-Uralic-Siberian Linguistic and Cultural Contacts''. Tartu, Estonia: University of Tartu, Division of Uralic Languages.

 
Proposed language families
Eskaleut languages